Mozart Estate Present Go-Kart Mozart in Mozart's Mini-Mart (shortened to Mozart's Mini-Mart) is the fourth studio album by Go-Kart Mozart, the musical project of former Felt and Denim frontman Lawrence. It was released on February 23, 2018 on West Midlands Records, a subsidiary of Cherry Red.

The album was originally envisioned by Lawrence as a mini-album, and was intended to be a companion piece to the band's previous album On the Hot Dog Streets. However, the mini-album was never completed in time, and has now been extended into a 17-track full-length album.

The album was produced by Ian Button, formerly of the band Death in Vegas. The album's release coincided with the remastered editions of the first five Felt albums by Cherry Red on CD and vinyl.

Track listing
All songs written by Lawrence and Terry Miles, except where noted.

"Anagram of We Sold Apes" - 2:35
"When You're Depressed" - 2:55
"Relative Poverty" - 2:52
"Zelda's in the Spotlight" - 2:47	
"Big Ship" (Raymond Froggatt) - 2:23	
"Nub-End in a Coke Can" - 0:55
"A Black Hood on His Head" - 2:25	
"Facing the Scorn of Tomorrow's Generation" - 1:34	
"A New World" (Roger Whittaker) - 2:19
"I'm Dope" - 1:27
"Crokadile Rokstarz" - 2:00	
"Knickers on the Line by 3 Chord Fraud" - 1:09
"Chromium-Plated We're So Elated" - 3:09
"Man of Two Sides" - 0:49
"Farewell to Tarzan Harvey" - 1:22
"A Ding Ding Ding Ding Dong!!" - 2:48	
"Anagram 1st Prize Reprize" - 0:42

References

2018 albums
Go-Kart Mozart albums